The Exclusion Crisis ran from 1679 until 1681 in the reign of King Charles II of England, Scotland and Ireland. Three Exclusion bills sought to exclude the King's brother and heir presumptive, James, Duke of York, from the thrones of England, Scotland and Ireland because he was Roman Catholic.  None became law. Two new parties formed. The Tories were opposed to this exclusion while the "Country Party", who were soon to be called the Whigs, supported it.  While the matter of James's exclusion was not decided in Parliament during Charles's reign, it would come to a head only three years after James took the throne, when he was deposed in the Glorious Revolution of 1688.  Finally, the Act of Settlement 1701 decided definitively that Catholics were to be excluded from the English, Scottish and Irish thrones, now the British throne.

Background

In 1673, when the Duke of York refused to take the oath prescribed by the new Test Act, it became publicly known that he was a Roman Catholic. In the five years that followed, growing concern regarding the shift towards the king and court's pro-French stance and perceived emulation of its Catholicism and arbitrary ('absolute') behaviour, led to growing opposition amongst some politicians and peers in Parliament. Between 1675 and 1678, the First Earl of Shaftesbury for example, highlighted in print and in the House of Lords the dangers of arbitrary government and Catholicism to Parliament, the nation, the rule of law, and English rights and liberties. This feat was exacerbated by the promulgation of the Duke of York's Catholicism and the Secret Treaty of Dover (1670).

In 1678, the Duke of York's secretary, Edward Colman, was named by Titus Oates during the Popish Plot as a conspirator to subvert the kingdom. Members of the Anglican English establishment could see that, in France, a Catholic king was ruling in an absolutist way, and a movement gathered strength to avoid such a form of monarchy from developing in England, as many feared it would if James were to succeed his brother Charles, who had no legitimate children. Sir Henry Capel summarised the general feeling of the country when he said in a parliamentary debate in the House of Commons of England on 27 April 1679:

Crises
The occasion that brought these sentiments to a head was the impeachment of Thomas Osborne, Earl of Danby, as a scapegoat for a scandal by which Louis XIV bought the neutrality of Charles's government with an outright bribe. Charles dissolved the Cavalier Parliament, but the new Parliament that assembled on 6 March 1679 was even more hostile to the king and to his unfortunate minister, and thus Danby was committed to the Tower of London.

On 15 May 1679, the supporters of Anthony Ashley Cooper, 1st Earl of Shaftesbury, introduced the Exclusion bill in the Commons with the intention of excluding James from the succession to the throne. A fringe group there began to support the claim to the throne of Charles's illegitimate – but Protestant – son, the Duke of Monmouth. As it seemed likely that the bill would pass in the House of Commons, Charles exercised his royal prerogative to dissolve Parliament again. Successive Parliaments attempted to pass such a bill, and were likewise dissolved.

End of the Crisis
While it should be treated with caution, the Exclusion Crisis is often identified as the point at which discernible political parties first emerged in England. Those who supported petitions asking Charles to recall Parliament and complete the passage of the Exclusion Bill were known as 'Petitioners' and later became Whigs. Those who opposed the Bill or the so-called Abhorrers developed into the Tories.

The nature of politics in this period is illustrated by the fact that Shaftesbury, who opposed James due to his similarities to the absolutist Catholic French regime, was supported financially by Louis XIV of France, who saw benefit in deepening English internal divisions. The Popish Plot was used by the Whigs to mobilise support, but moderates grew increasingly concerned by the hysteria that it generated, including causing the execution of 22 'conspirators' and accusing the Queen of conspiring to poison her husband. Many of Shaftesbury's supporters, such as the Earl of Huntingdon, now switched sides and after two failed attempts to pass the Bill, Charles succeeded in labelling the Whigs as subversives. Louis now switched financial support to Charles, allowing him to dissolve the 1681 Oxford Parliament. It was not called again during his reign, depriving the Whigs of their main source of political support, i.e., government patronage; the failed 1683 Rye House Plot then completed their isolation.

One long-lasting result of the crisis was the codification of the writ of Habeas Corpus: the one concrete achievement of the short-lived Habeas Corpus Parliament of 1679 before it was dissolved. In passing this act, the Whig leaders were concerned for their own persons, apprehensive (correctly) that the King would try to move against them through the courts. But the act far outlived the specific crisis, having long-term implications for the British legal system (and later, the American one).

In fiction

Robert Neill's 1972 historical novel The Golden Days depicts the Exclusion Crisis as experienced by two Members of Parliament representing a rural constituency. Sir Harry Burnaby is a staunch Royalist who had been knighted for having helped Charles II's Restoration; his neighbour and fellow MP is Richard Gibson, an ex-Colonel in Oliver Cromwell's New Model Army, and an outspoken member of the Green Ribbon Club and of the emerging Whig party. Despite their sharp political differences, Burnaby and Gibson come to deeply respect each other, and they share the anxiety lest the unfolding crisis escalate beyond control and England be plunged again into all-out civil war. Eventually, Burnaby's son marries Gibson's daughter, with the full blessing of both fathers.

See also
Religion in the United Kingdom
British monarchy
Popery
Popish Plot

Notes

Further reading

 
  
 
 
 

17th century in England
History of Catholicism in England
Political history of England
Kingdom of England
Anti-Catholicism in England
Anti-Catholicism in Wales
Anti-Catholicism in Scotland
Anti-Catholicism in Ireland
Anti-Catholicism in the United Kingdom
Charles II of England
James II of England
Constitutional crises
Succession to the British crown
Proposed laws